The following are a list of cars which raced under the Group C formula.  Some chassis may have raced in multiple Group C classes through its lifetime, though only the primary class it participated in is listed.

References

Group C
 
Group C